Donald Arthur Berry (born May 26, 1940) is an American statistician and a practitioner and proponent of Bayesian statistics in medical science.  He was the chairman of the Department of Biostatistics and Applied Mathematics at the University of Texas M. D. Anderson Cancer Center from 1999-2010, where he played a role in the use of Bayesian methods to develop innovative, adaptive clinical trials.  He is best known for the development of statistical theory relating to the design of clinical trials.  He is a fellow of the American Statistical Association and the Institute of Mathematical Sciences. He founded Berry Consultants, a statistical consulting group, with Scott Berry in 2000.

Biography 
Berry was born in Southbridge, Massachusetts, in 1940, and obtained an A.B. in mathematics from Dartmouth College, before moving to Yale University where he received an M.A and Ph.D. in statistics.  Berry initially "flunked out" of his undergraduate education at Dartmouth and joined the army, being stationed in Panama, but at the request of his Dean he returned to Dartmouth to complete his undergraduate education in mathematics.

References

External links

1940 births
Living people
American statisticians
Bayesian statisticians
Yale Graduate School of Arts and Sciences alumni
University of Minnesota faculty
Duke University faculty
University of Texas faculty
Fellows of the American Statistical Association
Dartmouth College alumni
People from Southbridge, Massachusetts